The year 1817 in architecture involved some significant events.

Buildings and structures

Buildings

 Dulwich Picture Gallery in London, designed by John Soane as the first purpose-built public art gallery in England, is completed and opened.
 The first Waterloo Bridge in London, designed by John Rennie the Elder, is completed.
 The Second Bank of the United States, in Philadelphia, designed by William Strickland, starts to operate.
 In Nassau, Bahamas, the lighthouse on Hog Island is built, replacing that at Fort Pincastle (built in 1793).
 Church of St. James the Great, Sedgley, in the Black Country of England, designed by Thomas Lee, is completed although not opened until 1823.
 Belsay Hall in Northumberland, England, designed for himself by Sir Charles Monck, 6th Baronet, probably with John Dobson, is completed.
 Lough Cutra Castle in Ireland, designed by John Nash, is completed.

Publications
 Thomas Rickman – An Attempt to discriminate the Styles of English Architecture from the Conquest to the Reformation, the first systematic treatise on Gothic architecture.

Awards
 Grand Prix de Rome, architecture: Antoine Garnaud.

Births
 January 6 – James Joseph McCarthy, Irish architect (died 1882)
 April 9 – Alexander Thomson, Scottish Greek Revival architect (died 1875)
 April 15 – John Raphael Rodrigues Brandon, English Gothic Revival architect (died 1877)
 May 19 – George John Vulliamy, English architect (died 1886)
 June 2 – John Gibson, English architect (died 1892)
 July 5 – John Loughborough Pearson, British architect (died 1897)
 Thomas Thomas, Welsh chapel architect and minister (died 1888)

Deaths
 July 19 – John Palmer, English architect working in Bath (born c.1738)
 September 8 – John Carter,  English draughtsman and architect (born 1748)
 November 5 – Carl Haller von Hallerstein, German-born architect and archaeologist (born 1774)

References

Architecture
Years in architecture
19th-century architecture